The Aknysta is a river of Anykščiai district municipality, Utena County, northeastern Lithuania. It originates from the Aknystėlis lake, flows through the Lipšys lake, and becomes a left tributary of the Šventoji. It flows for 18.2 kilometres and has a basin area of 94.2 km². The villages Aknystos and Aknysčiai are situated along the river.

The hydronym Aknysta possibly derives from  'eye, waterhole, ice-hole'.

References

Rivers of Lithuania
Anykščiai District Municipality